Sholomeh (also Romanized as Cholombeh, Chālomāh, Chalummah, Chulumbakh, Sholombeh, and Showlowmbeh) is a village in Khandan Rural District, Tarom Sofla District, Qazvin County, Qazvin Province, Iran. In the 2006 census, its population was 75, in 12 families.

References 

Populated places in Qazvin County